Spatz was an ITV children's television programme.

Spatz may also refer to:

Spatz (automobile), a German microcar
Mount Spatz, a mountain of Antarctica
Scheibe Spatz, a German glider
Scheibe SF-30 Club-Spatz, a German sailplane
Stadler SPATZ, a multiple unit railcar

People with the surname
Carl Spaatz (1891–1974), US Air Force general
Gary Spatz (born 1951), American acting coach
Gregory Spatz (born 1964), American author and musician
Hugo Spatz (1888–1969), German neuropathologist

See also
Spats (disambiguation)